KKCT (97.5 FM), known as Hot 97.5, is a Top 40 (CHR) radio station licensed to Bismarck, North Dakota.

Townsquare Media also owns KLXX 1270 (Talk), KBYZ 96.5 (Classic rock), KACL 98.7 (Oldies), and KUSB 103.3 (Country) in the Bismarck-Mandan area. All the studios are at 4303 Memorial Highway in Mandan, along with the AM transmitter and tower. All the FM transmitters are at a site in Saint Anthony, North Dakota, on 57th Road.

Construction permit

On December 15, 2009 KKCT was granted a U.S. Federal Communications Commission (FCC) construction permit to increase HAAT to 305.2 meters. The permit expired on December 15, 2012.

History
KKCT signed on in 1993 with a country music format as "Kat Kountry", which later became "K-Kountry". KKCT flipped to Contemporary Hit Radio (Top 40) as "Hot 97.5" in 2004, which led to competitor KYYY "Y93" switching to an adult contemporary format. Y93 changed back to Top 40/CHR in September 2012. However, on December 27, Y93 changed its branding to Mix 92.9, and flipped back to adult contemporary.

External links
Hot 97.5 official website

KCT
Contemporary hit radio stations in the United States
Radio stations established in 1993
1993 establishments in North Dakota
Townsquare Media radio stations